Munger is an unincorporated community in DuPage County, Illinois, United States.  Munger is a crossroads with no buildings, no housing, and no population. It is named after the Canadian National railroad siding which starts just west of Illinois Route 59, and goes west 6,125 feet. Munger Road crosses it almost right in the middle of the siding, about 1/2 mile south of Stearns Road.

Notes

Unincorporated communities in DuPage County, Illinois
Unincorporated communities in Illinois